The Pârâul Grecilor is a left tributary of the river Cârcinov in Romania. It flows into the Cârcinov in Dobrești.

References

Rivers of Romania
Rivers of Argeș County